Karel Josef Barvitius (born Karel Brodský on 9 December 1864 Německý Brod – 23 March 1937, Prague) was a publisher of books and music.

After studying law, he tried a career as a composer. In 1897, he set up a shop with musical instruments, and in 1914 he added music and book publishing. His published works were known for both high quality and low price. His son Karel Barvitius (1893–1949) continued his work, but in 1949 the publishing house was nationalized and became part of Supraphon company.

External links
 Biography (in Czech)

1864 births
1937 deaths
19th-century Czech people
20th-century Czech people
Czech publishers (people)
Czech composers
Czech male composers
People from Havlíčkův Brod